Margaret Jane Scott Hawthorne (17 January 1869–1 May 1958) was a New Zealand tailor, trade unionist and factory inspector. She was born in Carnafane (Cornafean), County Cavan, Ireland on 17 January 1869 to parents Henry Scott and Anne (nee Kenny) Scott

References

1869 births
1958 deaths
New Zealand trade unionists
People from County Cavan
Irish emigrants to New Zealand (before 1923)